The 1987 Currie Cup was the 49th edition of the Currie Cup, the premier annual domestic rugby union competition in South Africa.

Naas Botha scored all the points for Northern Transvaal by kicking 4 penalties and 4 drop-goals.

Teams

Competition

Regular season and title play-offs
There were seven participating teams in the 1987 Currie Cup Division A and five in the Division B. These teams played each other twice over the course of the season, once at home and once away. Teams received two points for a win and one points for a draw. The top two teams in Division A qualified for the title play-offs, along with the top team from Division B. In the semi-finals, the team that finished second in Division A had to play against the team that finished top of Division B, while the team that finished top of Division A had a bye through to the final. The top two teams in Division B qualified for the Division B finals.

The venue for the semi-final and the finals are determined by a rotation system. For example, if Team A and Team B played the final at the home venue of Team A on the previous occasion they met in a final, then Team B will host the next final, irrespective of log positions.

Promotion – Relegation play-offs
The bottom team on the respective logs qualified for the relegation play-offs. The Division A team played off against the team placed top in Division B. The winner of this match qualified for the 1988 Currie Cup Division A, while the losing team qualified for the 1988 Currie Cup Division B.

The bottom team on the Division B log qualified for the relegation play-offs. That team played off against the team that won the 1987 Santam Bank Trophy Division A over two legs. The winner over these two ties qualified for the 1988 Currie Cup Division B, while the losing team qualified for the 1988 Santam Bank Trophy Division A.

Log

Division A

Division B

Division A: Finals and play-offs

Semi-final
As champions of Division B,  qualified to the semi-finals of the Currie Cup competition, where they met Division A runners-up .

Final

Relegation play-offs
In the relegation play-offs,  beat  and won promotion to the Division A.  were relegated to Division B.

Division B: Final and play-offs

Final

Relegation play-offs
In the relegation play-offs,  beat  on aggregate to retain their place in the 1988 Currie Cup Division B.

See also

 Currie Cup

References

1987
1987 in South African rugby union
1987 rugby union tournaments for clubs